Derivative-free optimization (sometimes referred to as blackbox optimization), is a discipline in mathematical optimization that does not use derivative information in the classical sense to find optimal solutions: Sometimes information about the derivative of the objective function f is unavailable, unreliable or impractical to obtain. For example, f might be non-smooth, or time-consuming to evaluate, or in some way noisy, so that methods that rely on derivatives or approximate them via finite differences are of little use. The problem to find optimal points in such situations is referred to as derivative-free optimization, algorithms that do not use derivatives or finite differences are called derivative-free algorithms.

Introduction
The problem to be solved is to numerically optimize an objective function  for some set  (usually ), i.e. find  such that without loss of generality  for all .

When applicable, a common approach is to iteratively improve a parameter guess by local hill-climbing in the objective function landscape. Derivative-based optimization is efficient at finding local optima for continuous-domain smooth single-modal problems. However, they can have problems when e.g.  is disconnected, or (mixed-)integer, or when  is expensive to evaluate, or is non-smooth, or noisy, so that (numeric approximations of) derivatives do not provide useful information. A slightly different problem is when  is multi-modal, in which case local derivative-based methods only give local optima, but might miss the global one.

Some of these methods can be proved to discover optima, but some are rather metaheuristic since the problems are in general more difficult to solve compared to convex optimization. For these, the ambition is rather to efficiently find "good" parameter values which can be near-optimal given enough resources, but optimality guarantees can typically not be given. One should keep in mind that the challenges are diverse, so that one can usually not use one algorithm for all kinds of problems.

Algorithms
Notable derivative-free optimization algorithms include:
 Bayesian optimization
 Coordinate descent and adaptive coordinate descent
 Cuckoo search
 Beetle Antennae Search (BAS)
 DONE
 Evolution strategies, Natural evolution strategies (CMA-ES, xNES, SNES)
 Genetic algorithms
 MCS algorithm
 Nelder-Mead method
 Particle swarm optimization
 Pattern search
 Random search (including Luus–Jaakola)
 Simulated annealing
 Stochastic optimization
 Subgradient method

See also
 Mathematical optimization

References

External links

Optimization algorithms and methods